Jack Lyngcoln (5 January 1910 – 10 June 1990) was an Australian rules footballer who played with Collingwood in the Victorian Football League (VFL).

Lyngcoln appeared three times for Collingwood in the 1932 VFL season, in a strong team consisting of the Coventry brothers and Harry Collier. He later played at Northcote in the VFA and, with Alec Gray, joint coached them to the 1936 premiership.

References

External links

Holmesby, Russell and Main, Jim (2007). The Encyclopedia of AFL Footballers. 7th ed. Melbourne: Bas Publishing.

1910 births
Collingwood Football Club players
Northcote Football Club players
Northcote Football Club coaches
Australian rules footballers from Victoria (Australia)
1990 deaths